Équeurdreville-Hainneville is a former commune in the Manche department in Normandy in north-western France. On 1 January 2016, it was merged into the new commune of Cherbourg-en-Cotentin. Its population was 16,313 in 2019.

It was formed when Équeurdreville and Hainneville merged on 1 January 1965.

Heraldry

See also
Communes of the Manche department

References and notes

Equeurdrevillehainneville